The 14 July 1953 demonstration was an incident in Paris during which a march of the Algerian anti-colonial Movement for the Triumph of Democratic Liberties on Bastille Day was halted by the police, killing seven and seriously injuring about 50.

Background

Since 1936, though interrupted by the Vichy period and the German occupation, the French Communist Party, the General Confederation of Labour in France, and several similar movements organized a parade in Paris each Bastille Day to celebrate the values of the republic.

Since the beginning of the 1950s, Algerian separatists from the Movement for the Triumph of Democratic Liberties (MTLD), led by Messali Hadj, took part in the parade in spite of their differences with the French Communist Party on the issue of Algerian independence.

In 1953, tensions were high.  The demonstrations on International Workers' Day had been met with violence by the police.  The next year, on May 28, 1952, the Algerian communist Hocine Bélaïd was killed during the demonstration against Americal General Ridgway's visit to France; the general was accused of using biological weapons in Korea.

Events

The demonstration was very closely watched by the authorities; "offensive" signs, flags, and banners had been banned by the prefecture of police, along with "seditious" songs and chants.  The march was to follow a traditional course, travelling from Place de la République to Place de la Nation.  However, when it reached Rue du Faubourg-Saint-Antoine, some off-duty paratroopers attacked the demonstrators; they were beaten by the demonstrators and six were wounded.  The paratroopers continued to aggress the demonstrators; the police removed them each time, but made no arrests.

The demonstrators clashed with police at Place de la Nation, where most of the protesters dispersed.  The parade planned by the MTLD continued somewhat farther in spite of heavy rain, as some marchers went toward Avenue du Trône to drop their signs and flags in an MTLD truck.

There, and without warning, the police opened fire on them on their own initiative without direction from their command.  This escalated the demonstration; the Algerian demonstrators used barricades to attack the police and burned at least two police cars between 5:00 PM and 5:30 PM.  Seven people were killed: six Algerian workers, and one worker from the General Confederation of Labour.  Besides the deaths, over 50 demonstrators were injured, at least 40 by gunshots.  About fifty police officers were injured: between three and five by stabbing, and the remainder by makeshift weapons.

Aftermath

The Parisian authorities immediately tried to paint the demonstration as a clandestine riot.  To avoid public discussion, the government charged one police administrator with rebellion and violence on July 15, a charge which would not have required an investigation into the police shootings.  Despite this, that September, the scope of the judicial inquiry was expanded when family members of the victims moved an adhesion procedure.  Even in spite of this, few Algerian witnesses were heard in the trial.  The trial ended when the judge stayed the proceedings by issuing a non-lieu on October 22, 1957, later confirmed on appeal on January 23, 1958.

The French press was indignant about the shootings, but some newspapers also denounced both the communists and the separatists for assaulting the police.  The communists held a large meeting on July 21, the same day the Algerian victims' funerals were held, but did not take up the MTLD's demands for Algerian independence.

See also 

 Paris Massacre of 1961

References

Algerian War
1953 protests
1953 in Paris
Conflicts in 1953
July 1953 events in Europe
Deaths by firearm in France
French Fifth Republic
Massacres committed by France
Massacres in France
People shot dead by law enforcement officers in France
Political repression in France
1953
Racism in France
Mass murder in 1953
1953 murders in France
Algerian diaspora in France
Protests in France
Bastille Day